Norm Reidy (2 August 1924 – 1 February 2002) was  a former Australian rules footballer who played with Fitzroy in the Victorian Football League (VFL).

Notes

External links 

1924 births
2002 deaths
Australian rules footballers from Victoria (Australia)
Fitzroy Football Club players